Jessica Tomasi (born 3 July 1986) is an Italian female archer. At the 2012 Summer Olympics she competed for her country in the Women's team event.

References

External links
 
 
 
 

Italian female archers
1986 births
Living people
Olympic archers of Italy
Archers at the 2012 Summer Olympics
World Games medalists in archery
World Games silver medalists
World Games bronze medalists
Competitors at the 2009 World Games
Competitors at the 2013 World Games
Competitors at the 2017 World Games
Archers of Centro Sportivo Aeronautica Militare
21st-century Italian women